Guido Nicheli (24 July 1934 – 28 October 2007) was an Italian actor.

Selected filmography

 Cattivi pensieri (1976)
 Il padrone e l'operaio (1976) - Guido
 Saxofone (1979) - Guido - friend of Fiorenza
 Una vacanza bestiale (1981)
 Eccezzziunale... veramente (1982) - Uomo snob
 Il sommergibile più pazzo del mondo (1982) - Il generale americano
 Viuuulentemente mia (1982) - Rodolfo aka Rudy
 Si ringrazia la regione Puglia per averci fornito i milanesi (1982) - Ambrogio il barista
 Sapore di mare (1983) - Marito di Adriana
 Vacanze di Natale (1983) - Donatone
 Summer Games (1984) - Gino Carimati aka Nogi
 Domani mi sposo (1984) - Gastone
 Scemo di guerra (1985) - Rossi
 Yuppies (1986) - Company Owner
 Professione of Wine (1986, TV Series) - Giangi
 Montecarlo Gran Casinò (1987) - Ambrogio Colombo
 Tutti in palestra (1987, TV Mini-Series) - Adamo (1987)
 I ragazzi della 3ª C (1987–1989, TV Series) - Commendator Zampetti
 Sauces l'amore (1988, TV Mini-Series)
 Le finte bionde (1989)
 Occhio alla Perestrojka (1990) - Dott. Gerardo Moschin
 Abbronzatissimi (1991) - Uomo alla festa in piscina
 Anni 90 (1992) - Cliente del club ("Club per raffinati")
 Anche i commercialisti hanno un'anima (1994)
 Favola (1996, TV Movie) - L'ambasciatore
 Gratta e vinci (1996) - Giorgetti
 Panarea (1997) - Bedoni
 S.P.Q.R. (1998, TV Series) - Giulio Seneca
 Cucciolo (1998)
 Vacanze sulla neve (1999) - Dado Carloni
 Pastrami 2000 - La clonazione (1999) - Insegnante dell'Istituto Educazione al Potere
 Spaghetti sulla neve (1999)
 Ma il portiere non c'è mai? (2002, TV Mini-Series) - Padre Gianandrea
 Vita Smeralda (2006) - Captain

External links
Il Giornale: Guido Nicheli obituary (Italian)

1934 births
2007 deaths
Italian male actors
Actors from Bergamo